Collops balteatus, the red cross beetle, is a species of soft-winged flower beetle in the family Melyridae. It is found in the South Central United States and Mexico.

References

External links

 

Melyridae